Benjamin Hale Austin (January 10, 1832 – July 5, 1885) was a justice of the Supreme Court of the Kingdom of Hawaii from November 7, 1881 until his death on July 5, 1885.

Austin died at his home in the Nuʻuanu Valley on the island of Oʻahu.

References

Justices of the Hawaii Supreme Court
1832 births
1885 deaths